Brian J. Sullivan may refer to:

 Brian Sullivan (district attorney) (1966–2014), politician from Tacoma, Washington
 Brian Sullivan (Washington politician, born 1958), politician from Snohomish County, Washington